Balmain may refer to:

Places
 Balmain, New South Wales, a suburb of Sydney, Australia
 Electoral district of Balmain, an electoral division in New South Wales, Australia
 Balmain East, New South Wales, a suburb of Sydney, Australia
 Balmain House and country estate in Aberdeenshire, Scotland

People with the surname
 Allan Balmain, Distinguished Professor of Cancer Genetics at the University of California, San Francisco (UCSF)
 Louis Balmain (1858–1904), New Zealand cricketer
 Pierre Balmain (1914–1982), French fashion designer
 William Balmain (1762–1803), Scottish-born surgeon at the first European settlement in Sydney

Other
 Balmain bug, a crustacean, slipper lobster
 Balmain (fashion house), founded by Pierre Balmain
 Balmain Colliery, a former coal mine in Birchgrove, New South Wales